Papaya King is a fast food restaurant in New York City. It has a single location in the Upper East Side of Manhattan, its original location; it has made several attempts to expand to other locations, but these expansions have since closed.

History

Papaya King was founded and run for many years by the late Constantine "Gus" Poulos.  The original Papaya King was opened in 1932 on the corner of 86th St. and Third Ave. on the Upper East Side of Manhattan.  Although the restaurant originally only served drinks made from fresh tropical fruits, it soon expanded to serving hot dogs due to the influence of its neighborhood, which at the time was populated predominantly by German-American immigrants. It now also serves crispy curly fries, onion rings, fried pickles, fried Oreos, fried Twinkies, tater tots, knishes, cheese steaks and corn dogs.

Gus's son Peter started out managing the family's second store (with seating) at 87th Street and Third Avenue., before taking over the business from his father. In the 1930s, there was also a store in Upper Darby, Pennsylvania. During the 1970s, the Pouloses attempted to franchise the restaurant, and one franchise briefly opened in midtown.  A company-owned store opened in the 1980s at 59th Street and Third Avenue and closed in the mid-1990s. In 2001, another company-owned store opened in Philadelphia, this time on the campus of the University of Pennsylvania  at 40th and Locust Streets; it closed in 2004. In 2006, another attempted franchise opened briefly in the food court at Roosevelt Field Mall on Long Island, in Garden City, New York.  The Poulos family sold the business in the early 2000s.

Papaya King opened a restaurant at 1645 Wilcox Ave. in Hollywood (Los Angeles) California in 2011, but it had closed by the beginning of 2013. In May 2013, Papaya King opened a concept store on St. Marks Place, a historical and cultural crossroads in New York City’s East Village neighborhood.  The store featured a recessed patio area in front, widely referred to as “the stoop,” where customers and locals gathered. The store featured many of the classic elements that characterize the 86th Street location, with additional experiences such as vintage arcade games, a projector screen, a sound system, and branded merchandise. This location closed in November 2017 when the building was sold to a real estate developer. During the summer of 2014, Papaya King opened its first food truck that is parked throughout Manhattan and Brooklyn.

In May 2016, Papaya King expanded to Brooklyn and opened their third restaurant on the corner of Nevins Street and Flatbush Avenue in Downtown Brooklyn. This location mirrors the look of the original location in the Upper East Side.  At some point during 2017–2018, this restaurant closed.

In 2016, Papaya King started franchising with two locations in Las Vegas. The first opened on November 14, 2016 across from the Hard Rock Hotel, and a second 24-hour location opened at the Hawaiian Marketplace in March 2017. The Las Vegas locations were much larger than the counter-service-only restaurants in New York, and had full liquor licenses and waiter service. It was reported in November 2017, however, that both locations have closed.

In 2022, it emerged that the original 86th and 3rd location was at risk of closure.  The building had been purchased by Extell Development Company and rather than continue taking Papaya King's rent, Extell announced plans to demolish the one-story building (unusual in the pricey Upper East Side), presumably to replace it with a high rise.

Competition and imitation

The chain has had numerous New York City competitors that adopted its mix of hot dogs and tropical fruit drinks, including Gray's Papaya, Papaya Dog, Papaya Heaven, Papaya Paradise, and Papaya Place.  In 1976, Nathan's Famous set up shop next door to Papaya King, and a "hot dog war" ensued. Nathan's cut the price of its hot dogs from 50 to 35 cents, while Papaya King sold its hotdogs for a quarter. Six months later, Nathan's capitulated and left the block.

References

External links

 

Restaurants in Manhattan
Hot dog restaurants in the United States
Restaurants established in 1932
1932 establishments in New York City